The 2022 season was the Chicago Bears' 103rd in the National Football League (NFL) and their first under general manager Ryan Poles and head coach Matt Eberflus. They attempted to improve upon their 6–11 record from the previous season.

Despite having a good start to their season by starting with a 2–1 record, the Bears would begin to fall apart. They would go into a three-game losing streak before defeating the New England Patriots. Then, they would go into a ten-game losing streak, setting a new franchise record for longest losing streak. After a Week 13 loss to the Green Bay Packers and a New York Giants and Washington Commanders tie, the Bears were eliminated from playoff contention for the second consecutive season. With a Week 16 loss to the Buffalo Bills, the Bears failed to improve on their  6–11 record from the previous season. A loss to the Detroit Lions the following week marked the Bears 13th loss, tying a franchise record set in 1969 and 2016. Also, the loss meant that the Bears would finish last in the entire NFC. With their Week 18 loss to the Minnesota Vikings, combined with the Texans' win over the Colts, the team secured the first overall pick in the 2023 NFL Draft, which they traded to the Carolina Panthers on March 10, 2023 The Bears also lost 14 games for the first time in franchise history. The Bears also failed to win a game against a divisional opponent for the third time in franchise history following the 1969 and 2017 seasons.

Despite the struggles, second-year quarterback Justin Fields had a breakout season, becoming the third quarterback in NFL history to rush for 1,000 yards in a season, and set Bears single-season quarterback rushing yards record. The Bears also led the league in rushing with 3,014 yards on 558 attempts, breaking their previous single-season franchise yardage record of 2,974 set back in 1984.

Offseason

Offseason changes

Head coach

The Chicago Bears fired fourth-year head coach Matt Nagy on January 10, 2022, who most notably led the organization to one NFC North title and two NFL Playoffs appearances among other accolades. On January 27, 2022, Indianapolis Colts defensive coordinator Matt Eberflus was hired as the 17th head coach in franchise history. Eberflus will transition the Bears defense scheme from a 3–4 defense to a 4–3 defense.

General manager

The Chicago Bears fired seventh-year general manager Ryan Pace on January 10, 2022, who most notably led the organization to draft Eddie Jackson, Tarik Cohen, and other draftees. On January 25, 2022, Kansas City Chiefs executive director of player personnel Ryan Poles was named the general manager of the Bears.

Roster changes
The Chicago Bears made several moves in order to clear salary cap space, such as trading defensive end/outside linebacker Khalil Mack to the Los Angeles Chargers in exchange for a 2022 second round pick (48th overall; later used to draft Jaquan Brisker) and a sixth round pick in the 2023 NFL Draft.

Draft

Draft trades

Staff

Final roster

Preseason

Regular season

Schedule
The Bears' 2022 schedule was announced on May 12.

Game summaries

Week 1: vs. San Francisco 49ers

Week 2: at Green Bay Packers

Week 3: vs. Houston Texans

Week 4: at New York Giants

Week 5: at Minnesota Vikings

Week 6: vs. Washington Commanders

Week 7: at New England Patriots

This was the first time in franchise history the Bears defeated the Pats on the road.

Week 8: at Dallas Cowboys

Week 9: vs. Miami Dolphins

Bears quarterback Justin Fields set an NFL single-game regular season record for most rushing yards by a Quarterback at 178 rushing yards. This record surpassed Michael Vick. He also became the first QB in NFL history to throw for 3 touchdowns and have at least 150 rushing yards in 1 game and set a Bears franchise record for the longest rushing touchdown by a QB with a 61-yard touchdown run. For his efforts, Fields won NFC Offensive Player of the Week for Week 9.

Week 10: vs. Detroit Lions

With this loss, the Bears are the first team in NFL history to score at least 29 points in three consecutive games and lose all three. The Bears have lost to the Lions (scored 30 points), Miami Dolphins (scored 32 points) and Dallas Cowboys (scored 29 points) over the last three weeks.

Week 11: at Atlanta Falcons

Week 12: at New York Jets

Week 13: vs. Green Bay Packers

With this loss, the Bears no longer hold the record of most wins in NFL history, which they have had since 1921, with the Packers taking over. With the Giants and Commanders tying, the Bears were eliminated from the playoffs for the second straight season and for the tenth time in 12 seasons.

Week 15: vs. Philadelphia Eagles

With this loss, the Bears have dropped 7 straight, the 2nd longest losing streak in franchise history. Justin Fields also broke the team's single season QB rushing yards record set in 1972 by Bobby Douglass, now with 143 carries for 1,000 yards and 8 Touchdowns.

Week 16: vs. Buffalo Bills

Week 17: at Detroit Lions

The Bears lost their ninth straight, swept by Detroit for the first time since 2017, and will finish dead last in the NFC.

Week 18: vs. Minnesota Vikings

With this loss, the Bears have now lost seven straight home games, a new franchise record.

Standings

Division

Conference

References

External links
 

Chicago
Chicago Bears seasons
Chicago Bears